The Collectors is an album by the Canadian rock band The Collectors,  released in 1968.

Track listing
All songs by The Collectors except "Lydia Purple" by Don Dunn and Tony McCashen.

Side One
"What is Love?" (3:51)
"She (Will-O-the-Wind)" (3:51)
"Howard Christman’s Older" (5:08)
"Lydia Purple" (2:47)
"One Act Play" (3:42)

Side Two
"What Love (Suite)" (19:06)

Musicians
The Collectors
Howie Vickers - lead vocals
Bill Henderson - guitar, recorder, backing vocals
Claire Lawrence - tenor saxophone, organ, flute, recorder, backing vocals
Glenn Miller - bass, backing vocals
Ross Turney - drums, percussion

Additional musicians
Larry Knechtel - piano and harpsichord on "Lydia Purple"
Norm Jeffries - vibraphone on "Lydia Purple"
Jesse Ehrlich - cello on "Lydia Purple"

References

External links
Archive website

1968 debut albums
The Collectors (band) albums
Chilliwack (band) albums
Warner Records albums